Mame Diarra Diouf (born 6 August 1994) is a Senegalese footballer who plays as a defender for US Parcelles Assainies and the Senegal women's national team.

Club career
Diouf has played for AFA Grand-Yoff and Parcelles Assainies in Dakar, Senegal.

International career
Diouf capped for Senegal at senior level during the 2022 Africa Women Cup of Nations qualification.

References

External links

1994 births
Living people
People from Dakar Region
Senegalese women's footballers
Women's association football defenders
Senegal women's international footballers